Mexborough F.C. was an English association football club based in Mexborough, Doncaster, South Yorkshire.  The club's name was often given in the form Mexbro' or Mexboro.

History
The club was formed in 1876.  The club won the prestigious Sheffield Senior Cup for the first time in 1885-86 when beating Heeley at Bramall Lane.  The same season the club entered the FA Cup for the first time, drawing 1-1 with Staveley F.C. at the neutral Kilnshurst Ground in the first round. However Mexbro' was forced to scratch from the replay as the Sheffield Senior Cup tie with Owlerton F.C. took precedence and the Sheffield FA refused to grant an extension of time to play the Owlerton tie.

The club remained amateur in a professional era, the players - all locals - being paid expenses or "beer money", although many of the team were Methodist teetotallers.  In 1891 they were founder members of the Sheffield & District League. In 1893 they finished as league runners-up, and a year later they went one better, beating Sheffield Wednesday reserves in the league's play-off final. During the same season they also won the Sheffield Challenge Cup League.

In 1896 they won the Wharncliffe Charity Cup League, and the following season they entered the Midland League, finishing 13th in their first season. The 1897–98 campaign was the most successful in the club's history, winning the Midland League title as well as finishing runners-up in the Yorkshire League and reaching the 5th Qualifying Round of the FA Cup.

They decided to revert to more local football in 1899, joining the Sheffield Association League, but the fans' interest wained and the club seems to have wound up for financial reasons at the conclusion of the 1899-1900 season.

League and cup history

* League play-off winners

Colours

The club's colours were red and white, probably in a plain shirt as it registered no pattern.

Honours

League
Midland League
Champions: 1897–98
Yorkshire League
Runners-up: 1897–98
Sheffield Challenge Cup League
Champions: 1893–94
Sheffield & District League
Champions: 1893–94
Wharncliffe Charity Cup League
Champions: 1894–95

Cup
Sheffield Senior Cup
Winners: 1885–86, 1895–96

Records
Best FA Cup performance: 5th Qualifying Round, 1897–98

References

Defunct football clubs in South Yorkshire
Sheffield & District Football League
Midland Football League (1889)
Yorkshire Football League
Sheffield Association League